Anastasios "Tasos" Donis (Greek: Αναστάσιος "Τάσος" Δώνης; born 29 August 1996) is a Greek professional footballer who plays as a forward for Cypriot First Division club APOEL on loan from Ligue 1 club Reims and the Greece national team.

Club career

Youth career
In January 2013, Donis moved from Panathinaikos to Juventus for €300,000. The move was completed in May 2012, where he signed a three–year professional contract.

He became a star in the Primavera in Turin, scoring 17 goals in 45 games in both Campionato Nazionale Primavera and UEFA Youth League. This included scoring a hat–trick against Spezia U19 on 25 January 2014. He also scored twice on two occasions against Siena U19 and Cesena U19.

Sassuolo (loan)
On 2 February 2015, Donis joined Serie A side Sassuolo on loan for the remainder of the 2014–15 season. However, he made no appearances for Sassuolo, as he was sidelined, due to being on the substitute bench and his own injury concerns.

Lugano (loan)
In summer 2015, Donis joined Lugano for the 2015–16 season.

However, he suffered an injury that saw him miss the start of the season. He didn't make his debut until on 13 September 2015, where he came on as a substitute for Domagoj Pušić, in a 3–0 loss against FC Sion. Six days later, Donis scored his first goal for the club, in the second round of Swiss Cup, in a 3–2 win over AC Bellinzona after the game went extra time.

On 2 March 2016, he scored twice against FC Luzern to help his side progress to the final of the Swiss Cup for the first time in 23 years. He went on to score four goals in the competition; this includes scoring twice against FC Thun on 17 April 2016 and then netted the last goal on 25 May 2016 to seal the victory against St.Gallen on the last matchday of the season, helping his club avoid relegation. On 29 May 2016, Lugano lost 1–0 against relegated FC Zürich in the final of the Swiss Cup. Despite being sidelined on three more occasions later in the season, He ended his loan to Lugano with 8 goals and 7 assists in 29 appearances across all competitions.

OGC Nice (loan)
On 20 July 2016, Ligue 1 club OGC Nice officially announced that Donis had joined them on loan from Juventus. Nice had an option to buy him at the end of the season.

On 14 August 2016, matchday 1 of the 2016–17 Ligue 1 season, he made his debut for Nice as a substitute in a 1–0 win against Rennes. On 3 November 2016, he made his international club debut appearing as a substitute late in the match in a 2–0 home loss against FC Red Bull Salzburg in a 2016–17 UEFA Europa League group stage match.

Donis played a total of just 79 minutes in Ligue 1 before 12 February 2017 with all of them coming as substitute appearances. On 12 February, he replaced the injured Alassane Pléa in the 43rd minute with Nice losing 2–0 against Rennes and scored In the 59th minute contributing to a 2–2 draw. On 10 March 2017, he came on as a substitute and scored the leveller in the 77th minute of a league home game against SM Caen. Then, on 30 April 2017, he scored his fourth goal of the season, in a 3–1 win over Paris Saint-Germain, a win that saw but cost their chance of successfully defending their league title, which Monaco ultimately won. Three weeks later, on the last matchday of the season, he netted a brace in a 3–3 away draw against Olympique Lyonnais.

At the end of the season, with the club finished third place in a table, Donis finished the season, making twenty–two appearances and scoring five times in all competitions. Despite keen on staying at Nice for another season, Nice chose not to exercise their option to sign Donis for €2 million.

VfB Stuttgart
On 1 July 2017, Donis moved to VfB Stuttgart and signed a four-year-contract. Media estimated the transfer fee paid to Juventus is set at €4.2 million, while his former club Juventus will keep a future 20% resale rate, while the release clause of his contract set to €23 million.

On 13 August 2017, he made his debut with the club as a substitute in an away DFB Pokal game against FC Energie Cottbus. On 13 October 2017, Donis scored his first goal in Bundesliga, giving his club a half-time lead to a 2–1 home win game against 1. FC Köln. On 18 October 2017, Donis dislocated his shoulder in training and will miss between five and six weeks, the club confirmed. Stuttgart announced that despite the injury, 21-year-old Donis will not undergo an operation and will instead go through a normal rehabilitation process. On 13 December 2017, in his return to the squad, Donis had a muscular reaction in the first half of an away game against TSG 1899 Hoffenheim that will probably keep him out of action between two and three weeks. He then returned to the first team from injury on 13 January 2018, where he started and played 58 minutes before being substituted, in a 1–0 win over Hertha BSC. For the rest of the 2017–18 season, Donis spent the most of the time on the substitute bench. On 12 May 2018, he scored and gave an assist as Stuttgart won 4–1 on the final day of 2017–18 Bundesliga season to end Bayern's 37-game unbeaten home run in the Bundesliga. At the end of the 2017–18 season, Donis finished his first season at VfB Stuttgart, making nineteen appearances and scoring two times in all competitions.

Ahead of the 2018–19 season, it was announced that Donis was going to stay at VfB Stuttgart for another season. His first appearance of the season came on 18 August 2018, where he came on as a substitute, in a 2–0 loss against Hansa Rostock. He soon found himself behind the pecking order in the first team at VfB Stuttgart at the start of the season. On 29 September 2018, he scored his first goal in the season in a 2–1 home win game against SV Werder Bremen as he raced past the static visiting defence Miloš Veljković, charged beyond onrushing goalkeeper Jiří Pavlenka and scored in an empty net. On 1 December 2018, he scored the only goal as Santiago Ascacíbar right out to Andreas Beck, whose cross pass takes Donis directly and hits by low shot from 16 meters into the left corner, sealing a 1–0 home win game against FC Augsburg. On 27 January 2019, he levelled the score with a fine strike, who placed the ball like a postage stamp in the top right-hand corner of Manuel Neuer's goal, but his club could not avoid a 4–1 away loss against champions Bayern Munich.
On 27 April 2019, he scored the only goal in a 1–0 home win game against Borussia Mönchengladbach in his club effort to avoid relegation. Donis scored his fourth goal of the season, twice as many as in the previous season. Donis scored five of his six Bundesliga goals for a lead. On 11 May 2019, he scored his fifth goal in the season, as he shot from an acute angle technically demanding in the far corner giving a two goals' lead in a 3–0 win home game against VfL Wolfsburg.

Stade de Reims
On 2 September 2019, Donis was loaned out to Stade de Reims until the end of the season. He would move permanently to Reims if the club avoided relegation with a compulsory purchase option of €8 million for the summer of 2020. At the end of the season, he signed a four year contract with a transfer fee of €4 million.

Loan to VVV-Venlo 
On 1 February 2021, Donis moved to Eredivisie club VVV-Venlo, on a loan deal until the end of the season.

International career
Donis has represented Greece on multiple levels. He would also be eligible to play for England through birth but opted to play for Greece instead.

Youth 
In October 2013, Donis was called up to the Greece U19 for the first time. He made his Greece U19 debut, where he started the match before coming off in the first half, as they lose 3–0 to Austria U19 on 16 October 2013. A month later, he scored two goals between 14 November 2013 and 17 November 2013 against Bulgaria U19 and  Over the next two years, playing for the U19 side, Donis went on to make thirteen appearances and scoring two times.

In March 2016, Donis was called up for the Greece U21 for the first time. He made his Greece U21 debut on 24 March 2016 against Albania U21, starting the whole game, in a 0–0 draw. Seven months later, on 10 October 2016, he scored his first Greece U21 goal, in a 3–1 win over Hungary U21.

Senior
On 1 June 2017 he was called up in Greece national squad for the fixture against Bosnia and Herzegovina. On 9 June 2017, he made his debut for Greece as he came on as a substitution for injured Tasos Bakasetas, in a 0–0 draw. Two months later, on 31 August 2017, Donis made his first start for the national team and played the whole game, in a 0–0 draw against Estonia.
On 21 March 2019, he was subbed on for the injured Kostas Mitroglou and scored his first goal with Greece senior team in a 2–0 UEFA Euro 2020 qualifying away match against Liechtenstein.

Personal life 
Donis comes from a family of footballers. His father, Giorgos, was a professional footballer and Greece international, while his older brother, Christos, played for Panathinaikos. Both Christos and Anastasios played together when they were at Lugano.

Anastasios, nicknamed "Tasos", was born in Blackburn during his father's time at Blackburn Rovers. Because he was born in England, Donis has a British passport. In addition to speaking Greek, Donis also speaks Italian, which he learned from his time at Juventus.

Career statistics

Club

International 
Scores and results list Greece's goal tally first.

Honours
Juventus Primavera
 Supercoppa Primavera: 2013

References

External links
 
 
 
 

1996 births
Living people
Footballers from Blackburn
Greek footballers
Greece under-21 international footballers
Greece youth international footballers
Greece international footballers
English footballers
English people of Greek descent
Swiss Super League players
Bundesliga players
2. Bundesliga players
Ligue 1 players
Eredivisie players
FC Lugano players
Juventus F.C. players
U.S. Sassuolo Calcio players
OGC Nice players
VfB Stuttgart players
VVV-Venlo players
Stade de Reims players
Greek expatriate footballers
Expatriate footballers in Italy
Expatriate footballers in Switzerland
Expatriate footballers in France
Expatriate footballers in the Netherlands
Greek expatriate sportspeople in Italy
Greek expatriate sportspeople in Switzerland
Greek expatriate sportspeople in France
Association football wingers
Association football forwards